Kal Aqayeh-ye Olya (also Romanized as Kāl Āqāyeh-ye ‘Olyā; also known as Kāl Āqāyeh) is a village in Salehabad Rural District, Salehabad County, Razavi Khorasan Province, Iran. At the 2006 census, its population was 307, in 70 families.

References 

Populated places in   Torbat-e Jam County